Simon Fisher-Becker is a British stage, television and film actor, specialising in comedy and character parts.  His more notable roles include Tony Fazackerley in Puppy Love for the BBC, The Fat Friar in the Harry Potter film Harry Potter and the Philosopher's Stone, and Dorium Maldovar in series 5 and 6 of Doctor Who.

Filmography

Television
 An Ungentlemanly Act (1992) as Prisoner
 One Foot in the Grave (1 episode, 1993) as Magician
 Doctors  (1 episode, 2001) as Cyril Wilson
 Love Soup (1 episode, 2005) as Horatio
 Afterlife (1 episode, 2006) as Mini-cab driver
 Doctor Who (3 episodes & a prequel, 2010–2011) as Dorium Maldovar
 Doctor Who Confidential (1 episode, 2011) as himself
 Getting On (ep 3, 2012) as Stephen Ferris
 Waterside (2012) as Dante Harper
 Gay Boys (2012) as Mr Fitz-Hubbard, The Pope & Malcolm
 3some Webseries (2013) as Roger
 Puppy Love (2014) as Tony Fazackerley

Film
 Arrivederci Millwall (1990) as Shop Manager
 Beg! (1994) as Dr. Farth
 Sweet Thing (1999) as Klaus
 Harry Potter and the Philosopher's Stone (2001) as The Fat Friar
 Chakan, the Forever Man (2012) as Ethan Scott
 Rise of the Euphonious Angel (2012) as Dante
 Coveted Desires (2016) as Keith's Dad

Audio
 Doctor Who: The Curse of Sleepy Hollow (2013) as Father Hardwood (fan adventure)
 Big Finish - Gallifrey V - (2013)
 Big Finish - Irish Wildthyme 'Going Down' - (2013)
 Cog Work Pro. Doctor Who - Out Of Time 'The Voice' (2013)
 Illusionist Productions' Doctor Who: Tales of Mystery & Imagination (2 episodes, 2014) as Mr. Dike
 The Hawk Chronicles (2018–present) as Agent Tony Simon

References

External links
 
 

20th-century British male actors
21st-century British male actors
British male stage actors
British male television actors
British male film actors
Living people
Year of birth missing (living people)
Place of birth missing (living people)